Asota diastropha is a moth of the family Erebidae first described by Louis Beethoven Prout in 1918. It is found in Madagascar.

References

Asota (moth)
Lepidoptera of Madagascar
Moths of Madagascar
Moths of Africa
Moths described in 1918